Mount Shasta (also known as Mount Shasta City) is a city in Siskiyou County, California, at about  above sea level on the flanks of Mount Shasta, a prominent northern California landmark. Its population is 3,223 as of the 2020 census, down from 3,394 from the 2010 census. 


Commerce and tourism
 

The city of Mount Shasta is located in the Shasta Cascade area of Northern California. Visitors use the city as a base for trout fishing in the nearby Sacramento, McCloud and Klamath rivers, for climbing at Mount Shasta, Castle Crags or the Trinity Alps, or to view scenery. Both alpine and cross-country skiing runs are available nearby as well as biking or hiking to waterfalls, streams and lakes in the area, including nearby Mossbrae Falls, Lake Siskiyou, Castle Lake and Shasta Lake.

History
The site of the present-day city of Mount Shasta was within the range of the Okwanuchu tribe of Native Americans. During the 1820s, early Euro-American trappers and hunters first passed through the area, following the path of the Siskiyou Trail. The Siskiyou Trail was based on a network of ancient Native American footpaths connecting California and the Pacific Northwest. The discovery of gold at nearby Yreka, California in 1851 dramatically increased traffic along the Siskiyou Trail and through the site of present-day Mount Shasta. Pioneer Ross McCloud built one of the first lumber mills in the area, near the site of the present Sisson Museum. The completion of a stagecoach road between Yreka and Upper Soda Springs in the late 1850s led to the building of Sisson's Hotel, as a stop for weary travelers, and as a staging ground for adventuresome tourists intending to climb Mount Shasta.

The area where the town grew was known first as Strawberry Valley, and then as Berryvale. The post office opened in 1870 as Berryvale. After 1886 it was known as Sisson after a local businessman, Justin Hinckley Sisson who ran a stagecoach inn and tavern as well as donated the land for the town site and the Central Pacific Railroad station in 1886. Street names honor members of Sisson's family.

The 1887 completion of the Central Pacific Railroad, built along the line of the Siskiyou Trail, brought a dramatic increase in tourism, lumbering, and population into Mount Shasta. This early development continued to focus on tourism and lumbering. The early 1900s saw the influx of a large number of Italian immigrants to Mount Shasta and neighboring towns, most of whom were employed in the timber industry.

The city incorporated on May 31, 1905. The name of the city was finalized "City of Mount Shasta" on November 10, 1925, after a popular vote in 1922.

Geography

Mount Shasta is located at 41°18'52" North, 122°18'41" West (41.314542, -122.311510), along Interstate 5 south of Weed and north of Dunsmuir, California.

The area hydrology consists of an unnamed stream in the south part of town which joins Big Springs Creek, which then flows south as Cold Creek to join the headwaters of the South Fork of the Sacramento River. The typical depth to groundwater is quite shallow in the predominant alluvium.

The settlement is on the distal gently sloping southwest flanks of Mount Shasta, with the chief surficial soils being Quaternary alluvium. This alluvium is adjacent to and probably underlain by volcanic clastic rock deposited by Mount Shasta in the course of its development. Groundwater elevation is approximately at the elevation of the underlying native black peat soil. Where it occurs this peat, of approximately two feet thickness, is underlain by stream deposit sands and gravels.

Climate
Mount Shasta to the east forces moisture out of the air as it rises and cools, and the dip in the Klamath Mountains allows more moisture to reach inland, so the city receives more precipitation than the semiarid region to the north. Other towns in the region get much less snow, for example Yreka averages only , and much cooler Klamath Falls only . The Köppen climate classification is Csb, or warm-summer Mediterranean climate. It can be very warm and cold according to the Californian summer anex. The USDA hardiness zone is 7b.

Demographics

2010
The 2010 United States Census reported that Mount Shasta had a population of 3,394. The racial makeup of Mount Shasta was 3,041 (89.6%) White, 61 (1.8%) African American, 19 (0.6%) Native American, 56 (1.6%) Asian, 2 (0.1%) Pacific Islander, 51 (1.5%) from other races, and 164 (4.8%) from two or more races. Hispanic or Latino of any race were 277 persons (8.2%).

The Census reported that 3,358 people (98.9% of the population) lived in households, 6 (0.2%) lived in non-institutionalized group quarters, and 30 (0.9%) were institutionalized.

There were 1,664 households, out of which 401 (24.1%) had children under the age of 18 living in them, 537 (32.3%) were married couples, 190 (11.4%) had a female householder with no husband present, 84 (5.0%) had a male householder with no wife present. There were 113 (6.8%) unmarried couples, and only 9 (0.5%) same-sex couples. 719 households (43.2%) were made up of individuals, and 285 (17.1%) had someone living alone who was 65 years of age or older. The average household size was 2.02. There were 811 families (48.7% of all households); the average family size was 2.79.

The population was spread out, with 692 people (20.4%) under the age of 18, 242 people (7.1%) aged 18 to 24, 732 people (21.6%) aged 25 to 44, 1,109 people (32.7%) aged 45 to 64, and 619 people (18.2%) who were 65 years of age or older. The median age was 45.7 years. For every 100 females, there were 84.7 males. For every 100 females age 18 and over, there were 80.6 males.

The homeowner vacancy rate was 2.5%; the rental vacancy rate was 5.8%. 1,699 people (50.1% of the population) lived in owner-occupied housing units and 1,659 people (48.9%) lived in rental housing units.

2000
As of the census of 2000, there were 3,621 people, 1,669 households, and 926 families residing in the city. The racial makeup of the city was 91.77% White, 1.52% Black or African American, 0.44% Native American, 1.63% Asian, 0.14% Pacific Islander, 2.13% from other races, and 2.38% from two or more races. 5.83% of the population were Hispanic or Latino of any race.

There were 1,669 households, out of which 27.9% had children under the age of 18 living with them, 38.1% were married couples living together, 12.3% had a female householder with no husband present, and 44.5% were non-families. 38.0% of all households were made up of individuals, and 16.0% had someone living alone who was 65 years of age or older. The average household size was 2.14 and the average family size was 2.83.

In the city, the population was spread out, with 24.0% under the age of 18, 7.7% from 18 to 24, 24.5% from 25 to 44, 26.4% from 45 to 64, and 17.5% who were 65 years of age or older. The median age was 42 years. For every 100 females, there were 87.9 males. For every 100 females age 18 and over, there were 84.5 males.

The median income for a household in the city was $26,500, and the median income for a family was $37,313. Males had a median income of $37,697 versus $18,708 for females. The per capita income for the city was $20,629. 19.4% of the population and 14.9% of families were below the poverty line. Out of the total population, 31.5% of those under the age of 18 and 11.2% of those 65 and older were living below the poverty line.

Politics

The city council of Mount Shasta is composed of seven officials: five city council members, a City Treasurer and a City Clerk who are elected at large and serve a four-year term. The Mayor and Mayor Pro Tempore are elected each year from the five council members and serve a one-year term. Kathy Morter is currently serving as Mayor of Mount Shasta until November 2018, with Timothy Stearns serving as Mayor Pro Tem.

Local media

 KHWA 99.3/102.3 FM Mount Shasta
 KZRO-FM 100.1 Mount Shasta
 KKLC 107.9 K-LOVE, Fall River Mills
 KNSQ-FM 88.1 Jefferson Public Radio, Mount Shasta
 KLDD-FM 91.9 Jefferson Public Radio, Mount Shasta
 KMJC-AM 620 Jefferson Public Radio, Mount Shasta
 Mount Shasta Herald
 Northland Communications
 MCTV 15 Mountain Community Television

Notable people

 Terry Huntingdon – Miss California USA 1959, Miss USA 1959
 Ann Little – silent-film actress
 Anita Loos – writer and author of the screenplay Gentlemen Prefer Blondes was born in Sisson (now Mount Shasta) in 1888
 Jason Sehorn – former NFL cornerback, graduated Mount Shasta High School in 1989
 D. J. Wilson – basketball player, first-round selection in 2017 NBA draft; born in Mount Shasta

See also
 McCloud Railway
 Mount Shasta
 Mount Shasta City Park
 Mount Shasta Ski Park
 Shasta Abbey
 Shasta Lake

References

External links

 
 
 Museum of the Siskiyou Trail
Images of Mount Shasta from the Eastman’s Originals Collection,Special Collections Dept., University of California, Davis.

 
Cities in Siskiyou County, California
Incorporated cities and towns in California
Mount Shasta
Shasta Cascade
Populated places on the Sacramento River
Populated places established in 1905
1905 establishments in California